Chung Wai Literary Quarterly is a quarterly Taiwanese peer-reviewed scholarly journal publishing new and established poetries, fiction, academic journals, reviews, translations and non-fiction articles/essays, related to Western literature. Originally founded as a monthly literary magazine by Yen Yuan-shu and Chu Limin in 1972 and named Chung Wai Literary Monthly, the journal aims to encourage and promote critical and emerging approaches to non-local literatures and connect literature with other academic disciplines. It was widely regarded as a pioneering journal on comparative studies between Chinese and foreign literatures and had received numerous awards, including award from the National Central Library. The magnum opus of Taiwanese writer Wang Wen-hsing, Family Catastrophe, was also first published in Chung Wai. In 2007, the journal renamed and restructured as a quarterly and in 2019, the journal was recognized as a Grade I academic journal by the National Science and Technology Council of Taiwan.

References

External links

Magazines established in 1972
1972 establishments in Taiwan
National Taiwan University
Literary magazines